Stigmella johanssoni is a moth of the family Nepticulidae. It is only known from the Tian Shan Mountains in southern Kazakhstan.

Adults were found in August, but are probably also on wing in early summer.

The larvae feed on Salix species. They mine the leaves of their host plant. The mine consists of a broad gallery, occasionally forming a false blotch. The frass is black and deposited in a broad, irregular central line.

External links
Five new mining Lepidoptera (Nepticulidae, Bucculatricidae) from central Asia

Nepticulidae
Moths described in 1996
Endemic fauna of Kazakhstan
Moths of Asia